The women's 200 metre butterfly competition of the swimming events at the 2011 World Aquatics Championships was held on July 27 with the heats and the semifinals and July 28 with the final.

Records
Prior to the competition, the existing world and championship records were as follows.

Results

Heats
33 swimmers participated in 5 heats.

Semifinals
The semifinals were held at 19:03.

Semifinal 1

Semifinal 2

Final
The final was held at 18:48.

References

External links
2011 World Aquatics Championships: Women's 200 metre butterfly start list, from OmegaTiming.com; retrieved 2011-07-23.

Butterfly 200 metre, women's
World Aquatics Championships
2011 in women's swimming